Pål Eugen Bucher Skjønberg (20 October 1919 – 3 February 2014) was a Norwegian actor.

He was born in Stavanger to actors Eugen (1889–1971) and Henny Skjønberg (1886–1973). He was the older brother of actor Espen Skjønberg. They grew up in Bærum and Oslo. In 1946 he married actress Elisabeth Bang (1922–2009).

He made his stage debut for Bærum Studiescene during World War II. Both his brother and future wife were involved here too. He was later employed at the theatre Det Norske Teatret from 1945 to his retirement in 1989, except for the years 1951 to 1952 when he worked at Den Nationale Scene. His film debut came in 1946 in the film Englandsfarere. Another notable appearance was the film Ut av mørket, which was entered into the 8th Berlin International Film Festival. He appeared in at least 23 films and television shows between 1946 and 1991. Skjønberg was also a board member of Riksteatret from 1968 to 1976. He has received numerous awards, including the King's Medal of Merit.

He died in February 2014.

Selected filmography
 1946: Englandsfarere
 1946: Så møtes vi imorgen
 1953: Skøytekongen
 1957: Stevnemøte med glemte år
 1958: Ut av mørket
 1966: Hunger
 1969: Himmel og helvete as Hermansen, a policeman

References

External links
 

1919 births
2014 deaths
Actors from Stavanger
People from Bærum
Norwegian male film actors
Norwegian male stage actors
Norwegian male television actors
Recipients of the King's Medal of Merit in gold